Asteropeia amblyocarpa is a species of plant in the Asteropeiaceae family. It is endemic to Madagascar.  Its natural habitats are subtropical or tropical dry forests and rural gardens. It is threatened by habitat loss. It is included in several national parks.

References

Endemic flora of Madagascar
amblyocarpa
Critically endangered plants
Taxonomy articles created by Polbot
Taxa named by Edmond Tulasne